Hinduism is a minority religion in the Meghalaya state of India constituting 12% of the state's population. The Nartiang Durga Temple in Meghalaya is one of the 51 Shakti peethas on Earth and is considered by Hindus of Meghalaya as the permanent abode of Goddess Durga. Hinduism is a popular religion practice by Rabhas, Hajongs, Kochs, Rajbongshis, Mikirs, Bengalis, Nepalis, Biharis etc.

Tradition

Festivals
Hinduism is practiced by different groups of Meghalaya. Hindus celebrate many festivals in Meghalya. Diwali, Behdienkhlam, Navaratri, etc. are celebrated by people. Navaratri and other Goddess Pujas are celebrated mainly by Bengali people. Diwali is celebrated by almost all Hindus. 
In Jowai, Behdienkhlam is a harvest festival celebrate by the Niamtre believers. This festival is popular among non-Christian Pnar people.

Many other Hindu festivals celebrate Hindus like Makar Sankranti, Diwali, Holi, Navaratri,etc.

Important Temples and Shrines
In Meghalaya, there is Shaktipeeth at Jaintia hills in Nartiang. Here, Shakti is worshipped as Jayanti and Bhairava is worshipped as Kamadishwar. There many native Brahmins who caretakes temple and organises ritual programs. According to people, this Shakti peetha is only one on Earth which is abode of Durga

Hajong Tradition
Hajong people practice Hinduism from long time. They worship specific Avatars(equivalent to Hindu deities). 
Ex.-
Lakshmi-Lukkhi Dyao
Vishnu-Bishnu Dyao
Shiv-Shib Dyao
Kartikeya-Katka Dyao
Dyao is derived from Sanskrit word- (देव Deva,modern Indian languages- Dev/Deo).

Rabha people
Rabha people's religious world is pervaded with various spirits and natural objects. The main deity of the Rabhas is called Rishi. Rishi, for the forest Rabhas as well as village Rabhas, is a male deity. He is also known as Mahakal. Forest Rabhas worship him in all important social and religious ceremonies.

Demographics

Hinduism constituted 13.27 percent of Meghalaya's population in 2001 and it decreased to 11.53 percent in 2011. Hindus are mainly found in West Garo Hills district with 19%, East Khasi Hills District with 17.50% and the Ri-Bhoi District with 12%. Hinduism is followed by 42% of the population of Shillong.

Percentage in Groups
According to 2011 census there are 342,078 Hindus living in Meghalaya accounting constituting 11.53% of the state population after Christianity. Meghalaya Scheduled Tribe Population is 2,555,861 (86% of the state population), out of which 122,141 people among them follow Hinduism, while Non-ST population is 411,028, out of which 219,937 of them follow Hindu faith. 

Hinduism is practiced by these following groups:- 
Hajong people (38,054 – 98.65%  Hindu),
Koch people (22,494 – 99.02% Hindu)
Rajbongshi people
Rabha tribe (31,013 – 94.95% Hindu)
Karbi People (Mikir people). (14,380 – 52% Christian and 30% Hindu),
Nepali people (54,716 - 80%-90% Hindu 10%-20% Buddhist),
Bengali people (232,525 - 55%-60% Hindu, 40%-45% Muslim).
Punjabi people (4,540 - 65%-70% Sikh, 30%-35% Hindu) 
Marwari people (20,251 - 70%-80% Hindu, 20%-30% Jain)
Bihari people (42,654 - 70%-80% Hindu, 20%-30% Muslim)
Jaintia people (393,124 - 60% Christian, 40% following tribal religion "Ka Niamtre" with some elements of Hinduism in it).
Khasi people (10,302, 0.73% of the ethnic's population follows Hindu religion)
Garo people (4,776, 0.58% of the ethnic's population follows Hindu religion)

Persecution 
Percentage of Hindus in Meghalaya by decades

Hindu percentage in Meghalaya have declined from 18.49% in 1971 to 11.53% in 2011 census (A decline of -6.96% in four decades).

The Non-ST Hindu minority are being targeted, attacked and murdered by Christian tribals since from the time of the creation of Meghalaya in 1972. The Hindu minority of the state do not enjoy equal rights and there is widespread hatred, discrimination and intolerance against them which were perpetrated by local Khasi Students Union. The Bengali Hindus in Meghalaya are often treated as Bangladeshis or outsiders (Dkhar). They have been running away, leaving the state in large numbers since from 1972. 

Three ethnic-religious riots between the indigenous Christian tribes and the non- tribals mostly Hindus have taken place in the year 1979, 1987 and 1992 respectively. In 1979 almost 20 thousands Hindu Bengalis were displaced from Meghalaya following attacks by local Khasis. In 1987, almost 2.7 thousand Nepalis and Biharis were displaced from Meghalaya following land disputes with Christian tribals. Again in 1992, around 3 thousand Nepalis quit Meghalaya following clashes between Khasis and non-tribals during Dusherra. In 2018, there were repeatedly violence against Mazhabi Sikh which were perpetrated by local Khasis and Khasi Students Union members in around Shillong city. In 2020, The Hynniewtrep National Liberation Council (HNLC) has issued an ultimatum to all the Hindu-Bengalis to leave Ichamati and Majai areas at Shella in East Khasi Hills within one month which have ultimately lead to clashes between Hindu Bengalis and Khasi Christian tribals resulting in one death and several injuries.

References

Meghalaya
Religion in Meghalaya